Arjun Hingorani (15 Nov 1926 – 5 May 2018) was an Indian Bollywood director, producer and actor. He launched Dharmendra and Sadhana Shivdasani in Indian cinema. His other major contribution to Indian cinema was making the first Sindhi film titled Abana in 1958.

Career
He launched Dharmendra in the 1960 movie Dil Bhi Tera Hum Bhi Tere. Dharmendra, then, featured in many of his later films including Kab? Kyoon? Aur Kahan?, Kahani Kismat Ki, Khel Khilari Ka, Katilon Ke Kaatil etc. He was also known for naming his films with titles containing three Ks i.e. KKK. He also played roles in a few of his films such as in Kab? Kyoon? Aur Kahaan? (1970) and as the main villain in Kaun Kare Kurbanie (1991). Kaun Kare Kurbanie was his final film as director. In 2003, he produced his final film Kaise Kahoon Ke... Pyaar Hai.

Filmography

References

1926 births
2018 deaths
Hindi film producers
Hindi-language film directors
Sindhi people